Dibaphimitra is a genus of sea snails, marine gastropod mollusks in the family Mitridae.

Species
Species within the genus Dibaphimitra include:
 Dibaphimitra florida (Gould, 1856)

References

External links

Mitridae
Monotypic gastropod genera